Tom Becker (born 19 January 1981), real name Thomas Trevelyan Beckerlegge, is a British children's writer. He studied history at Jesus College, Oxford. He won the Waterstone's Children's Book Prize for his first novel, Darkside, at the age of 25.

Published books
 Darkside (2007)
 Lifeblood (2007)
 Nighttrap (2008)
 Timecurse (2009)
 Blackjack (2010)
 The Traitors (2012)
 While The Others Sleep (2013)

Awards and nominations
 2007 Darkside won the Waterstone's Children's Book Prize
 2008 Darkside longlisted for the Manchester Book Award

References

External links
 Welcome to Darkside (official) 
 Tom Becker biography at publisher Scholastic
 

1981 births
British children's writers
British horror writers
Alumni of Jesus College, Oxford
Living people